Melvyn is a masculine given name which may refer to:

 Melvyn Betts (born 1975), English cricketer
 Melvyn Bragg (born 1939), British broadcaster and author 
 Melvyn Caplan, British Conservative politician
 Melvyn Douglas (1901-1981), American actor
 Melvyn Dubofsky (born 1934), American professor of history and sociology
 Melvyn Gale (born 1952), English cellist, former member of the Electric Light Orchestra
 Melvyn Goldstein (born 1938), American social anthropologist
 Melvyn Grant (born 1944), English artist and illustrator
 Melvyn Greaves (born 1941), British cancer biologist and professor
 Mel Gussow (1933-2005), American theater critic, movie critic, and author
 Melvyn Hayes (born 1935), English actor
 Melvyn Jaminet, (born 1999), French rugby footballer
 Melvyn Jones (born 1964), British retired slalom canoer
 Melvyn P. Leffler (born 1945), American historian and professor
 Melvyn Levitsky (born 1938), American diplomat and former ambassador
 Melvyn Lorenzen (born 1994), German-English footballer
 Mel Machin (born 1945), English former footballer and manager
 Mel Meek, Welsh rugby league footballer of the 1930s and 1940s
 Melvyn B. Nathanson (born 1944), American mathematician and professor
 Melvyn Ong, Singaporean brigadier-general and Chief of the Singapore Army beginning 2015
 Melvyn R. Paisley (1924–2001), US Assistant Secretary of the Navy convicted of taking bribes
 Melvyn Rubenfire, American cardiologist and professor
 Mel Scott (1939-1997), English footballer
 Mel Stride (born 1961), British politician
 Melvyn Tan (born 1956), Singapore-born British classical pianist
 Melvyn J Taub (born 1960), pop/rock singer
 Melvyn Weiss (born 1935), American attorney who pleaded guilty to taking kickbacks from clients
 Melvyn Cassar (born 2001), Maltese customer care representative 
 Melvyn M. Sobel (born 1948),  Former leader of The Ravens (Roosevelt, New York)

See also
 Melvin, a given name and surname

Masculine given names
English masculine given names